Full-time or Full Time may refer to:

 Full-time job, employment in which a person works a minimum number of hours defined as such by their employer
 Full-time mother, a woman whose work is running or managing her family's home
 Full-time father, a father who is the main caregiver of the children and is generally the homemaker of the household
 Full-time equivalent, a unit that indicates the workload of an employed person or student
 Full-time (sports), the end of the game
 Full Time (film), a 2021 French film directed by Éric Gravel

See also 
 Part-time (disambiguation)